Sablan is a surname. Notable people with the surname include:

People
Anthony Sablan Apuron, former former archbishop of the Roman Catholic Archdiocese of Agaña, Guam.
Fred Sablan, musician from Cupertino, California
Gregorio Sablan, Northern Mariana Islander politician
Jesus Sablan, Northern Mariana Islander politician
Pascale Sablan, African-American architect
Rudy Sablan, Guamanian politician
Tina Sablan, Northern Mariana Islander politician
Vinnie Sablan, Northern Mariana Islander politician

Places
Sablan, Benguet, municipality in the Philippines